Kazakh clothing, worn by the Kazakh people, is often made of materials suited to the region's extreme climate and the people's nomadic lifestyle. It is commonly decorated with elaborate ornaments made from bird beaks, animal horns, hooves and feet. Although contemporary Kazakhs usually wear Western dress, the Turkic people wear more traditional clothing for holidays and special occasions.

Materials and production methods
Traditional materials used in Kazakh clothing include fabric, skin, felt, and fur. Embroidery, fur, jewelry, and ornamentation may also be used for decoration. Imported materials such as silk, brocade, and velvet can also be used for clothing, but are more expensive than traditional materials.

Traditional materials, such as horsehair, fox fur, sheep's wool and rabbit hides, are used in the production of clothing. Preparation of the materials includes skinning, drying, and greasing the hides with a mixture of sour milk and flour. After four days, the skins are washed and soaked in a concentrated brine. After more drying, the underside of the hide is scraped with a skinning knife before being heated; this gives the skin its whitish color. The fur is then ready for dyeing in a variety of colors. Yellow dye is made from the crushed root of the Taranovy plant.

Kazakhs often use white wool, and consider wool from the neck of a sheep valuable. The hair of the Bactrian camel is also used for more luxurious clothing. An undercoat, collected after the camel has molted, it is considered particularly valuable.
 
Imported cotton, silk, and woolen fabrics were used by Kazakh nomads. The feudal nobility used imported fabrics to make their clothing; less-affluent Kazakhs wore more easily accessible materials, such as furs, leather, and homemade wool. Fabrics were home-spun on a primitive, horizontal loom.

Women's clothing

Different fabrics are used, with more-expensive fabrics for festive wear and common fabrics for everyday use. The  is made by folding a piece of fabric in half and sewing the sides from the armpits to the bottom hem.

A  usually worn by unmarried Kazakh girls is typically made from a light, soft fabric which accentuates the waist.  means "sun-like" in Kazakh, and the word is used to describe this type of clothing.
Kazakh girls wear trousers made of sheepskin, homespun cloth, and heavy cotton fabrics. They may be short or long.

A  is a coat worn by women and men which is typically made of fox fur or, occasionally, goatskin. It is usually lined with camel or sheep wool and hemmed with otter fur on the sleeves for warmth during early spring and fall. A woman's  is distinguishable from a man's by its embroidered collar.

Unlike other clothing, it is not gender-specific and is worn by men and women. Chapans are made from various fabrics and are available in a range of colors (most often monochrome or dark). They are lined with a layer of wool or cotton. Festive velvet chapans are decorated with appliqué, brushing, and gold embroidery. This type of robe was worn by wealthy Kazakhs.

A  is a chapan which is quilted and strengthened with denser fabric.

Headgear

Headgear indicate a woman's relationship status. Unmarried girls wear a skullcap scarf and a warm, fur-edged cap. Wealthier girls' hats are made of bright velvet fabric and embroidered with golden thread.

These headdresses, often over a foot tall, are embedded with valuable ornaments such as pearls, coral, and pressed silver. They sometimes reach the bride's waist.

After the birth of her first child, a woman wears a hat made of white fabric (often for the rest of her life). The details of the hat vary by region to region. It has two parts; the bottom (kimeshka) is placed on the head and the top is twisted to form a turban.

Men's clothing

Men wear two types of skin shirts (without an undershirt), inner and outer trousers and loose-fitting robes made from various materials and belted with leather or cloth. During the 18th century, the top trousers were sewn from homespun camel hair fabric and skin. They had embroidered silk patterns in vegetable shapes, the ends often sheathed by an ornate band and lace and edged with fur.

Jackets were sewn from monochrome dark (occasionally multicolored) fabrics. They had a cloth lining, often insulated with a thin layer of wool.

The coat is often made of sheepskin, but may be made from the skin of raccoons or silver foxes. Nobles often wear , fur coats made from blue cloth covered (and trimmed) with beaver skin.  are often made by sewing together tanned sheepskins with wool on the inside; more prosperous Kazakhs wear  made from the wool of four- to five-month-old lambs.

Headgear 

An aiyr kalpak is a pointed, upturned cap, usually worn by the upper class. The fabric cap is decorated with unique, ornamental patterns to indicate wealth, power and social status.

A  is a hood worn by hunters, shepherds, and herdsmen which attaches to the coat collar. For camouflage, hunters wear differently colored  in different seasons: white in winter, green in summer, and yellow in autumn. A  is a light, round hat decorated with patterns which include zoomorphic embroidery, flowers, and animal horns.

Contemporary References 
In 2021, 14-year-old Kazakh Snezhanna Lee, an Aktobe native, won the gold cup and $1 million South Korean won ($851 USD) at the 7th annual International Super Queen Fashion contest in Seoul, South Korea. According to The Astana Times, the judges were fond of her traditional Kazakh outfits, among other skills, which led to her winning the prize.

References

History of Asian clothing
Kazakhstani culture
Folk costumes
Clothing by ethnicity